Mr. Jane and Finch is a 2019 Canadian documentary film, directed by Ngardy Conteh George. The film is a portrait of Winston LaRose, a longtime community activist in Toronto's Jane and Finch neighbourhood whose campaign for a Toronto City Council seat in the 2018 Toronto municipal election was upended by Doug Ford's decision to slash the size of the city council in half mid-campaign.

The film received a preview screening at the Toronto Black Film Festival on February 17, 2019, before having its television premiere on CBC Television on February 22 as an episode of CBC Docs POV.

The film won two Canadian Screen Awards at the 8th Canadian Screen Awards in 2020, for Best Writing in a Documentary Program and the Donald Brittain Award.

References

External links

2019 films
Canadian documentary television films
Documentary films about Black Canadians
Films shot in Toronto
Documentary films about Toronto
Documentary films about Canadian politicians
Donald Brittain Award winning shows
CBC Television original films
2010s English-language films
2010s Canadian films